Andrei Sergeyevich Korchagin (born 11 January 1980) is a former Russian professional footballer. He also holds Belarusian citizenship.

External links
 

1980 births
Sportspeople from Saratov
Living people
Russian footballers
Association football midfielders
Dinaburg FC players
FC Darida Minsk Raion players
FC Gornyak Uchaly players
FC Bashinformsvyaz-Dynamo Ufa players
FC Kristall Smolensk players
FC Yenisey Krasnoyarsk players
Latvian Higher League players
Belarusian Premier League players
Russian expatriate footballers
Expatriate footballers in Latvia
Expatriate footballers in Belarus
FC Sportakademklub Moscow players